= Peck Gulch =

Valley in Oregon, United States

Coordinates: 42°25′46″N 122°34′45″W

Peck Gulch is a valley in the U.S. state of Oregon.

Peck Gulch was named in 1876 after one Henry Peck.
